Craugastor inachus is a species of frogs in the family Craugastoridae.

It is endemic to Guatemala.
Its natural habitats are subtropical or tropical dry forests and rivers.
It is threatened by habitat loss.

References

inachus
Endemic fauna of Guatemala
Amphibians of Guatemala
Amphibians described in 2000
Taxonomy articles created by Polbot